An election for President of Israel was held in the Knesset on 30 October 1962.  Incumbent President Yitzhak Ben-Zvi stood again, and was the only candidate. He was re-elected with 62 of the 104 votes cast. Ben-Zvi's third term began on the day of the election. He later died before his term finished, on 23 April 1963.

Results

References

Presidential elections in Israel
President
Single-candidate elections
Israel